Aaron's Party: Live in Concert is teen pop star Aaron Carter's first concert DVD and third video release overall, released in 2001. The video peaked at #1 at US Billboard Top Music Video charts. The DVD was certified Platinum by RIAA on September 5, 2001.

Synopsis
The video features Aaron in concert at Disney MGM Studios performing songs from his 2000 album, Aaron's Party (Come Get It) among two others; "Life Is a Party" (from the animated film Rugrats in Paris and on the international edition of the album) and a non-album track, "One for the Summer".

Disney Channel aired the concert four months before it went to DVD and VHS with the same performance and behind-the-scenes clips of Aaron having fun at Disney World, but it also aired the Samantha Mumba performance at the concert, whereas the DVD omits Mumba performing and adds additional features along with the concert and Disney World clips.

The DVD release features footage from the concert including Aaron having fun in Disney World, Aaron's 13th birthday party, Carter recording his then-upcoming album, the music video for "That's How I Beat Shaq" along with a personal greeting from Aaron himself.

Track listing
 "Life Is a Party"
 "Bounce"
 "Tell Me What You Want"
 "Iko Iko"
 "One for the Summer"
 "I Want Candy"
 "That's How I Beat Shaq"
 "Aaron's Party (Come Get It)"

Special features
 "That's How I Beat Shaq" music video
 NBA's "Inside Stuff"
 The making of "That's How I Beat Shaq"
 Snippets of Aaron Carter in the studio recording Oh Aaron
 Personal greeting from Aaron Carter
 Aaron and family on performing
 Aaron on his dirtbike
 Aaron singing "Real Good Time" live from the House of Blues
 Aaron in the SNICK house underground with his #1 fan
 Aaron swimming with the fish
 Aaron and Leslie singing "Staying Alive"

Certifications and sales

References

2001 video albums
2001 live albums
Live video albums
Aaron Carter video albums